The Fußball-Bundesliga is Germany's top-flight football competition. In the course of its history it has from time to time been touched by scandal.

The Bundesliga scandal (1965) resulted in the demotion of Hertha BSC for illegal player payments.
The Bundesliga scandal (1971) resulted in the demotion of Arminia Bielefeld and the fining and suspension of over 50 players, as well as coaches and officials, for match fixing.
The Bundesliga scandal (2005) involved match fixing by referees in the 2. Bundesliga, Regionalliga, and in  German Cup matches that included Bundesliga sides.